Videla is a surname of Spanish origin and may refer to:

Jorge Rafael Videla (1925–2013), dictator of Argentina from 1976 to 1981
Gabriel González Videla (1898–1980), President of Chile from 1946 to 1952
Mario Videla (born 1962), Argentine footballer
Chantal Videla (born 2002), Filipino-Argentine actress and member of K-pop girl group Lapillus

See also
Chilean destroyer Videla, a Serrano class destroyer in the Chilean Navy
Videl, character in Dragon Ball media
Videle, town in Romania
Videlles, village in France
González Videla Antarctic Base